Woolvett is a surname. Notable people with the surname include:

Gordon Michael Woolvett (born 1970), Canadian actor
Jaimz Woolvett (born 1967), Canadian actor

See also
Woollett